Robert Crichton "Bob" Crosbie (2 September 1925 – 18 February 1994) was a Scottish footballer who played for Bury, Bradford Park Avenue, Hull City, Grimsby Town and Queen of the South.

References

1925 births
Footballers from Glasgow
1994 deaths
Scottish footballers
Association football forwards
Bury F.C. players
Bradford (Park Avenue) A.F.C. players
Hull City A.F.C. players
Grimsby Town F.C. players
Queen of the South F.C. players
English Football League players
Scottish Football League players